The 14th Golden Rooster Awards, honoring the best in film, were given on 1994 at the Changsha, Hunan province.

Winners and nominees

Best Film
Country Teachers/凤凰琴第一诱惑
东归英雄传

Best Director He Ping - Red Firecracker, Green Firecracker
Sai Fu/Mai Lisi - 东归英雄传

Best Directorial Debut
Yang Tao - Burning Snow

Best Writing
Jie Sheng/Liu Xinglong/Bu Yangui - Country Teachers
Wang Tianyun/Lu Shoujun - 第一诱惑

Best Actor
Li Baotian - Country Teachers
Wu Gang (actor) - Red Firecracker, Green Firecracker

Best Actress
Pan Hong - Shanghai Fever
Ning Jing - Red Firecracker, Green Firecracker
Bo Han - Romance in Metropolitan Shanghai

Best Supporting Actor
Fang Zige - No More Applause
Zhao Xiaorui - Red Firecracker, Green Firecracker
Yu Shaokang - Hurricane over the Sea

Best Supporting Actress
not awarded this year
Ding Jiali - No More Applause

Best Art Direction
Qian Yunxuan - Red Firecracker, Green Firecracker
Lv Zhichang/Yang Baocheng - Chongqing Negotiations
Zhao Mei - Country Teachers

Best Cinematography
Ge Ritu - 东归英雄传
Yang Lun - Red Firecracker, Green Firecracker
Cai Shunan/Ning Chao/Dong Yachun - Dog King

Best Editing
Sun Huiming - Narrow Escape
Nie Weiguo - 大漠歼匪

Best Music
Daoerji Cao - 东归英雄传
Ma Ding - Burning Snow

Best Sound Recording
Li Bojiang - Yunnan Story

Best Animation
鹿女
魔方大厦第八部——头盔城

Best Documentary
水中影
中国出了个毛泽东

References

External links
历届金鸡奖名单

Golden
Gold
1994